Lionel Rocheman (18 June 1928 – 30 July 2020) was a French musician, actor, and writer.

Biography
Rocheman was born on 18 June 1928 in the 12th arrondissement of Paris to a Jewish family of Polish origin. At the age of 16, Rocheman became one of the youngest maquisards in the Bureau Central de Renseignements et d'Action.

Rocheman studied at the Lycée Voltaire in Paris, where he obtained a baccalaureate in philosophy in 1946. He also studied musicology and subsequently became a musician of old French songs, the first of which was originally performed by Georges Brassens.

He was the father of pianist Manuel Rocheman, and was a member of the Sons and Daughters of Jewish Deportees from France. He was also a part of the Société des auteurs, compositeurs et éditeurs de musique, the Société des Auteurs et Compositeurs Dramatiques, and the Société des gens de lettres.

Lionel Rocheman died in Bagnolet on 30 July 2020 at the age of 92.

Distinctions
Grand Prix of the Académie Charles Cros (1970)
Silver Medal of the City of Paris
Gold Medal of the Société des auteurs, compositeurs et éditeurs de musique
Knight of the Ordre des Arts et des Lettres (2003)

Works

Stories
Devenir Cécile (1977)
Les Contes de grand-père Schlomo (1981)
La Belle Âge (1984)
Le Petit Monde de Schlomo (1989)
La Tendresse du rire (2005)
L'Âge d'être grand-père
Fontenoy et autres nouvelles
Rhapsodie ashkenaze

Essays
Les Manuscrits nazaréens de la Mer Morte (1993)
Sources sémitiques et mythe "indo-européen" (1996)
Jésus, énigmes et polémiques (2000)

Theatre
Grand-Père Schlomo (1979)

Filmography

Television
Les Amies de Miami (1988)

Film
I Don't Know Much, But I'll Say Everything (1973)
Les Bidasses en vadrouille (1978)
Le Grand Pardon (1981)
Chanel Solitaire (1981)
Le Retour des bidasses en folie (1982)
Deux heures moins le quart avant Jésus-Christ (1982)
Attention, une femme peut en cacher une autre ! (1983)
Paroles et Musique (1984)
Red Kiss (1985)
Je hais les acteurs (1986)
Fucking Fernand (1987)
Natalia (1988)
Virage (1995)

References

External links
 

1928 births
2020 deaths
Musicians from Paris
Male actors from Paris
French male writers
20th-century French Jews
French people of Polish-Jewish descent
Writers from Paris